Daniel Gómez Tanamachi (born 6 May 1990 in Mexico City) is a Mexican fencer. At the 2012 Summer Olympics he competed in the Men's foil, but was defeated in the second round. He competed at the 2016 Summer Olympics but was again knocked out in the second round.

Daniel Gómez is the current Central American and Caribbean Games champion. He is the only Mexican male fencer in history to win two games in a row as well. (Mayagüez 2010, Veracruz 2014)

Daniel Gómez also won two medals in the Pan American Games in Toronto 2015. He won 3rd place in the Men's Individual Foil Event and 3rd place in the Men's Foil Team Event.

See also
List of Pennsylvania State University Olympians

References

1990 births
Living people
Mexican male foil fencers
Olympic fencers of Mexico
Fencers from Mexico City
Fencers at the 2012 Summer Olympics
Fencers at the 2016 Summer Olympics
Fencers at the 2011 Pan American Games
Fencers at the 2015 Pan American Games
Pan American Games medalists in fencing
Pan American Games bronze medalists for Mexico
Mexican expatriates in the United States
Medalists at the 2015 Pan American Games